Donskoy is a town in Tula Oblast, Russia, located in the upper streams of the Don River,  southeast of Tula. Population:

History
Donskoy was granted town status in 1939.

Administrative and municipal status
Within the framework of administrative divisions, it is, together with two rural localities, incorporated as Donskoy Town Under Oblast Jurisdiction—an administrative unit with the status equal to that of the districts. As a municipal division, Donskoy Town Under Oblast Jurisdiction is incorporated as Donskoy Urban Okrug.

Notable people 
 Yuliya Snigir
 Irina Saltykova

References

Notes

Sources

External links

Official website of Donskoy 
Donskoy Business Directory 

Cities and towns in Tula Oblast